Events from the year 1775 in Great Britain.

Incumbents
 Monarch – George III
 Prime Minister – Frederick North, Lord North (Tory)
 Parliament – 14th

Events
 17 January – first performance of Richard Brinsley Sheridan's play The Rivals at the Covent Garden Theatre in London.
 9 February – American Revolution: British Parliament declares Massachusetts in rebellion.
 22 March – American Revolution: Edmund Burke's speech before the British Parliament on conciliation with the American colonies.
 3 April – Muzio Clementi makes his London debut as a harpsichordist.
 19 April – the American Revolutionary War begins with the Battles of Lexington and Concord.
 10 May – American Revolution: Capture of Fort Ticonderoga by Patriot forces.
 12 May – American Revolution: Battle of Crown Point.
 12 June – American Revolution: British forces offer a pardon to all colonists who would lay down their arms.
 16 June – American Revolution: Battle of Bunker Hill.
 5 July – American Revolution: the Continental Congress sends the Olive Branch Petition to King George III, hoping for a reconciliation.
 30 July – second voyage of James Cook:  anchors at Spithead, Captain Cook having completed the first eastabout global circumnavigation.
 12 August – 3 November: American Revolution – Battle of Fort St. Jean.
 23 August – American Revolution: refusing even to look at the Olive Branch Petition, King George issues a Proclamation of Rebellion against the American colonies.
 24 September – American Revolution: Battle of Longue-Pointe.
 9 December – American Revolution: Battle of Great Bridge – victory by the Virginia's Second Regiment and the Culpeper (Virginia) Minuteman Battalion, leads to withdrawal of the British from the port of Norfolk Borough.
 30–31 December – American Revolution: Battle of Quebec – British forces repulse an attack by the American Continental Army.
 1775–76 Winter – Unusually deadly influenza epidemic in London kills nearly 40,000.

Undated
 Industrial Revolution
 John Wilkinson (industrialist) invents and patents a new kind of boring machine.
 The 1769 Watt steam engine patent is extended to June 1800 by Act of Parliament and the first engines are built under it.
 Josiah Wedgwood introduces jasperware pottery.
 Actress Sarah Siddons makes her debut at the Drury Lane Theatre as Portia in The Merchant of Venice but is not well received.

Publications
 Samuel Johnson's A Journey to the Western Islands of Scotland.

Births
 24 January – John Buonarotti Papworth, architect (died 1847)
 30 January – Walter Savage Landor, writer (died 1864)
 10 February
Charles Lamb, writer (died 1834)
James Smith, author (died 1839)
 12 February – Louisa Adams, First Lady of the United States (died 1852 in the United States)
 12 March – Joseph Chitty, lawyer and legal writer (died 1841)
 23 April – J. M. W. Turner, painter (died 1851)
 13 May – Henry Crabb Robinson, man of letters, lawyer and diarist (died 1867)
 5 July – William Crotch, composer (died 1847)
 31 August – Agnes Bulmer, poet (died 1836)
 25 November – Charles Kemble, actor (died 1854)
 14 December – Thomas Cochrane, 10th Earl of Dundonald, admiral (died 1860)
 16 December – Jane Austen, novelist (died 1817)

Deaths
 8 January – John Baskerville, printer (born 1707)
 6 February – William Dowdeswell, politician, Chancellor of the Exchequer (born 1721)
 7 March – Thomas Nuthall, politician and attorney
 28 May – Barlow Trecothick, merchant and politician (born c. 1719)
 17 June – Major John Pitcairn, marine (killed in battle) (born 1722)
 16 September – Allen Bathurst, 1st Earl Bathurst, privy councillor (born 1684)
 21 November – John Hill, botanist and writer (born c. 1716)
 7 December – Charles Saunders, admiral (born c. 1715)

References

Further reading
 
 

 
Years in Great Britain